The Battle of Ephesus was a naval battle off the coast of Asia Minor near Ephesus in which the Rhodian fleet, commanded by Agathostratus, defeated a Ptolemaic fleet under the Athenian admiral Chremonides. The battle is only briefly mentioned by Polyaenus in his book on stratagems. It is also possible that the battle was not part of a wider imperial conflict between the great Hellenistic powers, but a confrontation between Rhodes and Ptolemaic Egypt alone. Along with Cos and Andros, Ephesus was instrumental in breaking Ptolemaic sea-power in the Aegean Sea, and replacing it with Macedonian and Rhodian predominance.

References

Sources
 
 
 

Ephesus (c. 258 BC)
Ephesus
Ephesus
Ephesus
Ancient Aegean Sea
3rd century BC in Greece